Antonio Signorini (2 April 1888 – 23 February 1963) was an influential Italian mathematical physicist and civil engineer of the 20th century. He is known for his work in finite elasticity, thermoelasticity and for formulating the Signorini problem.

Life

Honors
He was awarded the gold medal of the Accademia Nazionale delle Scienze detta dei XL in 1920, while he was working at the University of Palermo: the members of the judging commission were Luigi Bianchi, Guido Castelnuovo and Tullio Levi-Civita.

In 1924, on 8 June, he was elected ordinary non resident member of the mathematics division of the Accademia Pontaniana.

On 30 May 1931 he was elected corresponding member of the Società Nazionale di Scienze, Lettere e Arti in Napoli: later on, precisely on 11 February 1933 and on 4 June 1949 he was elected, respectively, ordinary member and ordinary non resident member of the same academy.

He was elected corresponding member of the Accademia Nazionale dei Lincei on July 15, 1935, and then national member on February 4, 1947. However, he was never awarded the royal prize of this academy, because he became a very early a member of it, thus losing the right to win a prize.

Work

Research activity 
His scientific production includes more than 114 works, being papers, monographs and textbooks, 17 of which have been collected in his "Opere Scelte" (Selected works).

Teaching activity 
Among his "allievi" there are some of the most important Italian mathematicians and mathematical physicists; a partial list of them is below:

Carlo Cattaneo
Ida Cattaneo Gasparini
Piero Giorgio Bordoni
Giuseppe Grioli
Giuseppe Tedone
Carlo Tolotti

He was also a close friend and teacher of Gaetano Fichera at the Istituto Nazionale di Alta Matematica, inspiring his research in continuum mechanics, his solution of the Signorini problem and the creation of the field of variational inequalities.

Selected publications
. An important work, summarizing Signorini's approach to continuum mechanics of finite strains.
. A volume collecting the most important works of Antonio Signorini with an introduction and a commentary of Giuseppe Grioli.

See also 
Constitutive equation
External ballistics
Finite strain theory
Signorini problem

Notes

References

Biographical and general references
. The "Yearbook" of the renowned Italian scientific institution, including an historical sketch of its history, the list of all past and present members as well as a wealth of information about its academic and scientific activities.
. The "Yearbook 2015" of the Accademia Pontaniana, published by the Academy itself and describing its past and present hierarchies and its activities. It also gives some notes on its history, the full list of its members and other useful information.
, available from the Biblioteca Digitale Italiana di Matematica.

. The birth of the theory of variational inequalities remembered thirty years later (English translation of the title) is an historical paper describing the beginning of the theory of variational inequalities from the point of view of its founder.
. 
 . This article, published in Signorinis's "Selected works" and whose English translation title is "The work of Antonio Signorini in Mathematical Physics" in the English translation, is an ample commentary on Signorini's work in mathematical physics written by one of his "allievi".
. The "Commemoration of Antonio Signorini" written by his colleague and close fiend Mauro Picone.
. The "Yearbook" of the renowned Italian scientific institution, including the list of all past and present members as well as a wealth of information about its academic and scientific activities.

Scientific references
.
.
.
, . The encyclopedia entry about problems with unilateral constraints (the class of boundary value problems the Signorini problem belongs to) he wrote for the Handbuch der Physik on invitation by Clifford Truesdell.

1888 births
1963 deaths
20th-century Italian mathematicians
Italian civil engineers
20th-century Italian physicists
Mathematical physicists
People from Arezzo
Academic staff of the Sapienza University of Rome
University of Palermo alumni
Academic staff of the University of Palermo